Mangala Muhurta (Kannada: ಮಂಗಳ ಮುಹೂರ್ತ) is a 1964 Indian Kannada film, directed by M. R. Vittal and produced by U. Subba Rao. The film stars R. N. Sudarshan, Harini, Raja Shankar and K. S. Ashwath in the lead roles. The film has musical score by Rajan–Nagendra.

Cast
R. N. Sudarshan
Harini
Raja Shankar
K. S. Ashwath

References

External links

1964 films
1960s Kannada-language films
Films scored by Rajan–Nagendra
Films directed by M. R. Vittal